The Bank of Albania is the central bank of Albania. Its main headquarters are in Tirana, and the bank also has five other branches located in Shkodër, Elbasan, Gjirokastër, Korçë, and Lushnjë, while its Research and Training Center is located in Berat.

History

In the first few years following Albania's declaration of independence on 28 December 1912, the fledgling country lacked a central bank. Under Ismail Qemali's leadership a first central bank was created on 4 October 1913 but it only lasted a few months. In the early 1920s, foreign currency was used for all transactions, generating considerable chaos, and in 1923 municipalities were allowed to issue their own banknotes. One project floated by the League of Nations envisaged a central bank for Albania as a cooperative venture co-sponsored by various European governments, with Albania itself owning only 10 percent of its share capital.

The consolidation of the Albanian national government eventually allowed for the creation of a central bank on 2 September 1925, called the National Bank of Albania. In line with a shareholders' convention involving the Albanian government and concluded in March 1925, the National Bank's original share capital was held by a mix of Italian, Yugoslav and Albanian partners plus minority stakes of the Basler Handelsbank and Société Générale de Belgique, in which the Italian interests dominated. Unusually for a central bank, the National Bank was not only independent from the Albanian government, but it was also a foreign institution, with legal seat in Rome and led by an Italian official: this was explicitly inspired by the precedent of the State Bank of Morocco, whose board met in Paris even though its registered headquarter was in Tangier. The National Bank's founding meeting and subsequent meetings of its governing body were correspondingly held in Rome, where the seat of the National Bank of Albania appears to have been located on Piazza dell'Esedra, at the corner with the Via Nazionale and thus not far from the Bank of Italy.

The National Bank's central office in Albania was in Durrës, opened on 29 November 1925. The bank opened further branches in Shkodër on 1 November 1926, in Vlorë on 15 November 1926, and subsequently in Berat, Elbasan, Korçë, and Sarandë. Its new headquarters building on Skanderbeg Square in Tirana was inaugurated on 30 October 1938, on a rationalist design elaborated between 1930 and 1936 by Italian architect Vittorio Ballio Morpurgo, who had also designed the branch offices in Durrës and Korçë. The Tirana seat took over the Albanian central functions previously located in Durrës.

Under the Italian protectorate of Albania (1939–1943), the National Bank also opened a branch in Prizren which had then been annexed to Albania, and the extension of its activity to Montenegro was briefly considered as well. Under the German occupation of Albania, the National Bank kept operating but under increasingly difficult conditions, and was forced by the occupiers to transfer its gold reserves from Rome to Berlin.

Following the country's liberation from German occupation in late 1944, the Albanian operations of the National Bank were nationalized on 13 January 1945 and renamed the State Bank of Albania. The National Bank's Italian legal entity was liquidated in 1957.

In 1992, a new banking system was established, with the central bank renamed the Bank of Albania. In 1996, an agreement was reached to return most of the former National Bank's gold reserves to Albania.

The headquarters building of the Bank of Albania was renovated and expanded in the early 2010s on a design by the Italian firm Petreschi Architects.

Bank overview
The bank's primary objective is the maintenance of price stability. The bank also promotes and supports the development of the foreign exchange regime and system, the domestic financial market, the payment system, and contributes to improving monetary and lending conditions.

The Bank also acts as manager of the county's currency by balancing the currency in circulation and credit within the economy. This role is important because allowing too much currency into circulation would lead to inflation and allowing too little currency in circulation would prevent the economy from growing. As acting currency manager, the Bank of Albania pursues to reach equilibrium between two extremes, which is to promote economic growth by maintaining price stability.

The Bank also acts as the fiscal agent of the Albanian Government. Since being the central Bank of Albania, the bank performs a wide range of financial services dealing with billions of Albanian Leks. The government keeps an open account with the bank, through which it makes many domestic and international financial transactions. The Treasury operations, which consist of receipts and expenses made by the government is not carried out within the Bank of Albania, but through commercial banks.

Supervisory role

The Bank of Albania supervises and regulates all activity of banks and institutions operating banking activity within the country. The Bank of Albania enforces rules on the establishment of banks and institutions and licenses them. The bank also supervises and monitors all activity of these institutions to ensure that they follow and obey the laws and regulations.

The central bank supervises the banking system for the following purposes:
to promote stability of the banking system and to protect the interests of depositors and the general public;
to ensure a sound banking system whose activities are transparent to and governed by market economy;
to provide an environment of confidence for investors and depositors while enabling growth and profitability for the industry.

The role of banking supervision is to promote safety and soundness by:
ensuring through a licensing process that only fit and proper owners and management, that fulfill the legal, professional and ethical requirements, have the right to enter the banking market; and that they have adequate capital in line with the risks to be undertaken, and have operating policies and procedures to control those risks;
ensuring that existing banks operate soundly in accordance with law and regulations, have adequate capital and liquidity for foreseeable needs, maintain satisfactory asset quality and adequate resources to offset perceived risks, exercise international standards for best practice in the management of their activities, and conduct their affairs in a manner that is not harmful to clients and general public;
ensuring that banking problems are resolved quickly and efficiently in a manner that protects depositors to the fullest extent possible, and minimizes the cost to Government and public.

To fulfill this role, banking supervision:
drafts and revises regulations governing entry to the system, prudential operation of banking activities while in the system, monitors the results achieved, receivership and conservation-ship of banks, and enforces compliance with those laws and regulations;
establishes pro-active policies and strategies for the supervision of individual banks and the banking system that are based upon an assessment of inherent risks;
develops supervisory procedures, standards and guidelines that are consistent with international practice;
implements those procedures, standards and guidelines consistently;
assures adequacy of staff in terms of number and proficiency to properly supervise the industry;
sponsors and participates in regular communications with the industry and other supervisors on matters of common interest or concern.

Monetary policy
The monetary policy of Albania is an exclusive right of the Bank of Albania. The Policy is designed to achieve the primary goal, to achieve and maintain price stability. The architect of coming up with the policy is based on, the respective legal framework, the academic background employed for modeling and predicting inflation on suitability of the operational target and the set of monetary instruments used to finalize the monetary policy goals. The Bank of Albania is committed to achieving and maintaining annual inflation at 3.0%, with a tolerance band of +/- 1 percentage point. The annual inflation for the third quarter of 2014 was 1.7%.

The Bank of Albania manages open market operations through the purchase or sale of securities.  These transactions play a main role in the transmission of monetary policy in the banking system. The main reason of using open market operations is the short-term liquidity management of the banking system and trying to stabilize market interest rates. The standing facilities are tools available to banks at their own initiative without restriction under normal circumstances. They consist of tools providing and absorbing overnight liquidity. The interest rates and these tools provide a passage in which the money market interest rates can fluctuate. The minimum reserve requirements serve as a tool targeting at regulating the banking system liquidity and stabilizing the money market interest rates.  The amount of minimum reserves to be held by each commercial bank is determined in relation to its reserve base applying the required reserve ratio. This ratio is also the same for the Lek and foreign currency liabilities. The current required ratio is 10 percent. The Bank of Albania's minimum reserve system allows banks to use the averaging provisions. Banks are allowed to 40 percent if their required reserve. They must show the average of the reserve balance will not be less than the reserve requirement by the end of the maintenance period. Required reserves denominated in the Albanian currency are reimbursed at a rate derived from the base rate, while holdings of required reserves in foreign currency are also reimbursed at a rate derived from the base rate of the European Central Bank and Federal Reserve.

Governors

See also

Economy of Albania
Albanian lek
Monetary Gold Removed from Rome in 1943 (Italy v. France, United Kingdom and United States)

References

External links

The Bank of Albania Retrieved on 01-03-2009.

Central banks
1925 establishments in Albania
Banks established in 1925
Banks of Albania